The 2017–18 season was Atalanta Bergamasca Calcio's seventh consecutive season in Serie A. The club competed in Serie A and the Coppa Italia, and had qualified for the group stage of the UEFA Europa League following a fourth-place finish the previous season, the club's best league result at the time.

The season was coach Gian Piero Gasperini's second at the club. Atalanta ended the season in 7th, qualifying for the second qualifying round of the 2018–19 UEFA Europa League. The club was eliminated in the Coppa Italia by eventual winners Juventus, in the semi-finals.

Players

Squad information
Last updated on 20 May 2018
Appearances include league matches only

Transfers

In

Loans in

Out

Loans out

Pre-season and friendlies

Competitions

Serie A

League table

Results summary

Results by round

Matches

Coppa Italia

UEFA Europa League

Group stage

Knockout phase

Round of 32

Statistics

Appearances and goals

|-
! colspan=14 style=background:#DCDCDC; text-align:center| Goalkeepers

|-
! colspan=14 style=background:#DCDCDC; text-align:center| Defenders

|-
! colspan=14 style=background:#DCDCDC; text-align:center| Midfielders

|-
! colspan=14 style=background:#DCDCDC; text-align:center| Forwards

|-
! colspan=14 style=background:#DCDCDC; text-align:center| Players transferred out during the season

Goalscorers

Last updated: 20 May 2018

Clean sheets

Last updated: 20 May 2018

Disciplinary record

Last updated: 20 May 2018

References

Atalanta B.C. seasons
Atalanta
Atalanta